Juan Luis Bernal Cuéllar (born 7 November 1972), commonly known as Juanlu, is a Spanish retired footballer who played as a central defender, and is the assistant coach of Recreativo de Huelva.

External links

Racing de Ferrol biography 

Juanlu at Footballdatabase

1972 births
Living people
Footballers from Jerez de la Frontera
Spanish footballers
Association football defenders
Segunda División players
Segunda División B players
Tercera División players
Betis Deportivo Balompié footballers
Real Betis players
CF Extremadura footballers
Écija Balompié players
Albacete Balompié players
Polideportivo Ejido footballers
Racing de Ferrol footballers
Real Balompédica Linense footballers
Motril CF players
Lucena CF players
Spain youth international footballers
Spain under-21 international footballers
Spanish football managers